Arasarkulam Keelpathi  is a village in the  
Aranthangi Revenue block of Pudukkottai district, Tamil Nadu, India.

Demographics 

Arasarkulam Keelpathi had a total population of 3951 with 1920 males and 2031 females (2011 census). Out of the total population 2704 people were literate.
The people of this village earn their living by agriculture. Others also have emigrated to various other countries to earn their living.

References

Villages in Pudukkottai district